Gandaria City is a mixed-use complex including a shopping mall, an office tower, apartment towers, and a hotel at Kebayoran Lama, Jakarta, Indonesia developed by Pakuwon Jati. The shopping mall, Sheraton Grand Gandaria City hotel, apartment towers and office tower are all directly connected. The development has a land area of about 8.5 hectares.

Gandaria City Mall
The mall consists of 3 Basement Parking Floors, 5 Shopping Center Floors, and 1 Floor for Skenoo Hall.
The main tenants of this mall are: Metro department Store, Lotte Mart, Uniqlo, Informa home furnishing, Ace Hardware, Eat & Eat foodcourt, Cinema XXI, Electronic Solution, Celebrity Fitness, Amazone entertainment center, Gramedia bookstore, Paperclip stationery store and Toys Kingdom. There are more than 400 other stores in the mall. A convention center with an area of 6,200 square meters also located within the mall.

Gandaria Mainstreet And Skenoo Hall 
Gandaria Mainstreet is another unique and impressive attraction in Gandaria City with a length of 600 meters with double levels consisting of indoor or outdoor. Complete with restaurants, bistros, lounges, cafes, Dessert places to entertainment. The mainstreet destination is alluring for families and young growing population. Designed by Genius Loci, a renowned interior design firm with offices in Singapore, Shanghai and Jakarta, the Main Street thematic concept reflects all the different architectural features of Batavia (Old Town) at one end and New York Time Square on the other. The neighborhood on Main Street is further enhanced by Piazza, an outdoor stage and a landscaped architecture park that serves as a venue for events and shows.

Skenoo Hall is a convention and exhibition center with an area of 6,200 square meters. The 2,500-seat auditorium is located on the 3rd floor of Gandaria City Mall and has brought pop concerts and family shows to important events. Examples Disney Live, Mister Maker Comes to town, and a concert by Cuban-American rapper Pitbull with the theme of Global Warming.

See also

 List of shopping malls in Jakarta

References

Shopping malls in Jakarta
Buildings and structures in Jakarta
Post-independence architecture of Indonesia
Residential skyscrapers in Indonesia
South Jakarta